Sofia Collinelli (born 24 August 2001) is an Italian professional racing cyclist, who currently rides for UCI Women's Continental Team . She is the daughter of Andrea Collinelli, who won a gold medal in the individual pursuit at the 1996 Atlanta Olympics.

Career
Collinelli has won gold medals in the team pursuit at the World Junior Championships and European Junior Championships in 2018 and 2019. In 2019 at the European Junior Championships was also bronze medal in the madison.

References

External links
 
 

2001 births
Living people
Italian female cyclists
Sportspeople from Ravenna
Cyclists at the 2018 Summer Youth Olympics
Cyclists from Emilia-Romagna